The angular diameter, angular size, apparent diameter, or apparent size is an angular distance describing how large a sphere or circle appears from a given point of view. In the vision sciences, it is called the visual angle, and in optics, it is the angular aperture (of a lens). The angular diameter can alternatively be thought of as the angular displacement through which an eye or camera must rotate to look from one side of an apparent circle to the opposite side. Humans can resolve with their naked eyes diameters of up to about 1 arcminute (approximately 0.017° or 0.0003 radians). This corresponds to 0.3 m at a 1 km distance, or to perceiving Venus as a disk under optimal conditions.

Formula

The angular diameter of a circle whose plane is perpendicular to the displacement vector between the point of view and the center of said circle can be calculated using the formula

When , we have , and the result obtained is in radians.

For a spherical object whose actual diameter equals  and where  is the distance to the center  of the sphere, the angular diameter can be found by the formula

The difference is due to the fact that the apparent edges of a sphere are its tangent points, which are closer to the observer than the center of the sphere.  The difference is significant only for spherical objects of large angular diameter, since the following small-angle approximations hold for small values of :

Estimating angular diameter using the hand

Estimates of angular diameter may be obtained by holding the hand at right angles to a fully extended arm, as shown in the figure.

Use in astronomy

In astronomy, the sizes of celestial objects are often given in terms of their angular diameter as seen from Earth, rather than their actual sizes. Since these angular diameters are typically small, it is common to present them in arcseconds. An arcsecond is 1/3600th of one degree (1°) and a radian is 180/π degrees. So one radian equals 3,600 × 180/ arcseconds, which is about 206,265 arcseconds (1 rad ≈ 206,264.806247"). Therefore, the angular diameter of an object with physical diameter d at a distance D, expressed in arcseconds, is given by:
.

These objects have an angular diameter of 1:
an object of diameter 1 cm at a distance of 2.06 km
an object of diameter 725.27 km at a distance of 1 astronomical unit (AU)
an object of diameter 45 866 916 km at 1 light-year
an object of diameter 1 AU (149 597 871 km) at a distance of 1 parsec (pc)

Thus, the angular diameter of Earth's orbit around the Sun as viewed from a distance of 1 pc is 2, as 1 AU is the mean radius of Earth's orbit.

The angular diameter of the Sun, from a distance of one light-year, is 0.03, and that of Earth 0.0003. The angular diameter 0.03 of the Sun given above is approximately the same as that of a human body at a distance of the diameter of Earth.

This table shows the angular sizes of noteworthy celestial bodies as seen from Earth:

The table shows that the angular diameter of Sun, when seen from Earth is approximately 32 (1920 or 0.53°), as illustrated above.

Thus the angular diameter of the Sun is about 250,000 times that of Sirius. (Sirius has twice the diameter and its distance is 500,000 times as much; the Sun is 1010 times as bright, corresponding to an angular diameter ratio of 105, so Sirius is roughly 6 times as bright per unit solid angle.)

The angular diameter of the Sun is also about 250,000 times that of Alpha Centauri A (it has about the same diameter and the distance is 250,000 times as much; the Sun is 4×1010 times as bright, corresponding to an angular diameter ratio of 200,000, so Alpha Centauri A is a little brighter per unit solid angle).

The angular diameter of the Sun is about the same as that of the Moon. (The Sun's diameter is 400 times as large and its distance also; the Sun is 200,000 to 500,000 times as bright as the full Moon (figures vary), corresponding to an angular diameter ratio of 450 to 700, so a celestial body with a diameter of 2.5–4 and the same brightness per unit solid angle would have the same brightness as the full Moon.)

Even though Pluto is physically larger than Ceres, when viewed from Earth (e.g., through the Hubble Space Telescope) Ceres has a much larger apparent size.

Angular sizes measured in degrees are useful for larger patches of sky. (For example, the three stars of the Belt cover about 4.5° of angular size.) However, much finer units are needed to measure the angular sizes of galaxies, nebulae, or other objects of the night sky.

Degrees, therefore, are subdivided as follows:
 360 degrees (°) in a full circle
 60 arc-minutes in one degree
 60 arc-seconds in one arc-minute

To put this in perspective, the full Moon as viewed from Earth is about °, or 30 (or 1800). The Moon's motion across the sky can be measured in angular size: approximately 15° every hour, or 15 per second. A one-mile-long line painted on the face of the Moon would appear from Earth to be about 1 in length.

In astronomy, it is typically difficult to directly measure the distance to an object, yet the object may have a known physical size (perhaps it is similar to a closer object with known distance) and a measurable angular diameter. In that case, the angular diameter formula can be inverted to yield the angular diameter distance to distant objects as 

In non-Euclidean space, such as our expanding universe, the angular diameter distance is only one of several definitions of distance, so that there can be different "distances" to the same object.  See Distance measures (cosmology).

Non-circular objects
Many deep-sky objects such as galaxies and nebulae appear non-circular and are thus typically given two measures of diameter: major axis and minor axis. For example, the Small Magellanic Cloud has a visual apparent diameter of  × .

Defect of illumination
Defect of illumination is the maximum angular width of the unilluminated part of a celestial body seen by a given observer. For example, if an object is 40 of arc across and is 75% illuminated, the defect of illumination is 10.

See also
 Angular diameter distance
 Angular resolution
 Solid angle
 Visual acuity
 Visual angle
 Perceived visual angle
 List of stars with resolved images
 Apparent magnitude

References

External links 
Small-Angle Formula
Visual Aid to the Apparent Size of the Planets

Elementary geometry
Astrometry
Angle